David Craig Hoopes (born August 15, 1942) was special assistant to the U.S. President from 1971 to 1977 and later an investment adviser.

Hoopes was born to Lorenzo Hoopes and his wife Stella in Twin Falls, Idaho.  As a young man he served a mission for the Church of Jesus Christ of Latter-day Saints (LDS Church) to Argentina. He received a BA in political science and an MA in International Public Administration from Brigham Young University.  

Hoopes then received an MPA and Ph.D. from the University of Southern California. While working on these degrees he served as president of Anthony Craig & Associates in Los Angeles. He was also a consultant to a California legislative committee on reorganizing the Los Angeles Unified School District.

In 1971 Hoopes joined the Nixon Administration and was made Special Assistant to the President in 1974 . After Gerald Ford lost his bid for re-election, Hoopes returned to the private sector working for Bechtel Corporation.

From 1998 to 2001, Hoopes was president of the Chile Santiago South Mission of the LDS Church. From 2004 to 2007 he was president of the Caracas Venezuela Temple. He also served as a bishop in the LDS Church.

Hoopes married Diane Tuttle, the daughter of A. Theodore Tuttle. They are the parents of seven children.

Sources
bio from registry of Hoopes papers at Nixon Library
"New mission presidents", Church News, March 14, 1998

1942 births
20th-century Mormon missionaries
21st-century Mormon missionaries
Brigham Young University alumni
Living people
Mission presidents (LDS Church)
American Mormon missionaries in Chile
American Mormon missionaries in Argentina
Nixon administration personnel
People from Twin Falls, Idaho
Temple presidents and matrons (LDS Church)
USC Sol Price School of Public Policy alumni
American expatriates in Venezuela
American leaders of the Church of Jesus Christ of Latter-day Saints
Latter Day Saints from Idaho
Latter Day Saints from California